The year 1898 in art involved some significant events.

Events
Berlin Secession.
Bromsgrove Guild of Applied Arts, a company of artists and designers associated with the Arts and Crafts Movement, is founded by sculptor Walter Gilbert in Britain.
Käthe Kollwitz's cycle of lithographs and etchings The Weavers is first exhibited publicly.
The term "Young Poland" is coined after a manifesto by Artur Górski, published in the Kraków newspaper Życie ("Life"), to signify the period of modernism in the Polish arts.
Henri Matisse marries Amélie Noellie Parayre and, on the advice of Camille Pissarro, goes to London to study the paintings of J. M. W. Turner, continuing to Corsica.
The Hope Collection of Pictures is sold in London for the sum of £121,550.

Works

Paintings
Edwin Austin Abbey – King Lear, Act I, Scene I
José Ferraz de Almeida Júnior – The Inopportune
Ivan Aivazovsky – Among Waves
Teodor Axentowicz – Self-portrait
Arnold Böcklin – Plague
Edward Burne-Jones – The Last Sleep of Arthur in Avalon (completed)
John Collier – Godiva
Luigi Crosio – Refugium Peccatorum Madonna
Evelyn De Morgan – Helen of Troy
Herbert James Draper – The Lament for Icarus
Thomas Eakins – Salutat
Paul Gauguin – The White Horse (Musée d'Orsay, Paris)
J. W. Godward
At The Gate Of The Temple
Idle thoughts
On The Balcony (first version)
The Ring
Vilhelm Hammershøi – Interior with young man reading
Edward Robert Hughes – The Shrew Katherina
Anna Elizabeth Klumpke – Rosa Bonheur
Henri Matisse – Le Mur Rose
Edvard Munch – Metabolism
Pierre-Auguste Renoir – Yvonne and Christine Lerolle at the Piano
L. A. Ring – Ved frokostbordet og morgenaviserne ("At Breakfast")
Therese Schwartze – Portrait of Wilhelmina of the Netherlands in her coronation robes
Henry Ossawa Tanner – The Annunciation
James Tissot – Self-portrait
F. C. Yohn – Winter at Valley Forge - The Relief

Sculptures

Arthur Beter – Dutchy
John S. Conway – The Victorious Charge
Reinhold Felderhoff – Diana
Daniel Chester French – Statue of Rufus Choate

Other
F. Holland Day
The Seven Last Words of Christ, a series of photographs
Study for the Crucifixion, a photograph
Félix Vallotton – Intimités ("Intimacies"), a suite of woodcuts
Mary Seton Watts – Watts Cemetery Chapel (Compton, Surrey, England), gesso interior decoration

Births

January to June
28 January – Milan Konjović, Serbian painter (died 1993)
3 February – Alvar Aalto, Finnish architect and designer (died 1976)
8 February – Jean Charlot, French painter and illustrator (died 1979)
14 March – Reginald Marsh, French-born American painter (died 1954)
6 April – Jeanne Hébuterne, French painter and model (suicide 1920)
16 May
Jean Fautrier, French painter, practitioner of tachisme (died 1964)
Tamara de Lempicka, born Maria Górska, Polish-born Art Deco painter (died 1980)
17 May – A. J. Casson, Canadian painter (died 1992)
21 May
Armand Hammer, American art collector (died 1990)
John McLaughlin, American hard-edge painter (died 1976)
17 June – M. C. Escher, Dutch graphic artist (died 1972)

July to December

2 July – Gen Paul, French painter (died 1975)
17 July – Berenice Abbott, American photographer (died 1991)
22 July – Alexander Calder, American sculptor and artist (died 1976)
30 July – Henry Moore, English artist and sculptor (died 1986)
31 July – Doris Zinkeisen, Scottish-born theatrical designer and commercial artist (died 1991)
26 August – Peggy Guggenheim, American art collector (died 1979)
12 September – Arkady Shaikhet, Ukrainian-born Soviet documentary photographer (died 1959)
16 September – Leslie Garland Bolling, African American sculptor (died 1955)
25 September – Robert Brackman, Ukrainian-born American artist and teacher (died 1980)
10 October
Lilly Daché, French milliner and fashion designer (died 1989)
Georges Malkine, French painter, only painter to sign the Surrealist Manifesto of 1924 (died 1970)
21 November – René Magritte, Belgian surrealist painter (died 1967)
6 December – Alfred Eisenstaedt, Prussian-born American photographer (died 1995)
10 December – Ivan Tabaković, Serbian painter (died 1977)
date unknown – E. Chambré Hardman, British photographer (died 1988)

Deaths
8 January – Achille Empéraire, French painter and friend of Paul Cézanne (born 1829)
25 February – Francis Frith, English topographical photographer (born 1822)
16 March – Aubrey Beardsley, English illustrator, of tuberculosis (born 1872)
24 March – J. L. K. van Dort, Ceylonese illustrator (born 1831)
18 April – Gustave Moreau, French Symbolist painter (born 1826)
17 June – Sir Edward Burne-Jones, English Pre-Raphaelite artist (born 1833)
29 July – Arturo Michelena, Venezuelan painter (born 1863)
8 August – Eugène Boudin, French landscape painter (born 1824)
24 October – Pierre Puvis de Chavannes, French painter (born 1824)
date unknown - Giulio Salviati, Italian glassmaker and mosaicist (born 1843)

References

 
Years of the 19th century in art
1890s in art